Tupaia (also spelled Tupaea or Tupia;  1725 – December 20, 1770) was a Tahitian Polynesian navigator and arioi (a kind of priest), originally from the island of Ra'iatea in the Pacific Islands group known to Europeans as the Society Islands.  His remarkable navigational skills and Pacific geographical knowledge were to be utilised by Lt. James Cook, R.N. when he took him aboard HMS Endeavour as guide on its voyage of exploration to Terra Australis Incognita. Tupaia travelled with Cook to New Zealand, acting as the expedition's interpreter to the Polynesian Māori, and Australia. He died in December 1770 from a shipborne illness contracted when Endeavour was docked in Batavia for repairs ahead of its return journey to England.

Early life
Tupaia was born at Ha'amanino Harbour on Ra'iatea around 1725 and became a leading ariori priest for the Taputapuatea marae. Tupaia was trained in the fare-'ai-ra'a-'upu, or schools of learning, about the origin of the cosmos, genealogies, the calendar, proverbs and histories. He was also taught how to be a star navigator. His memorized knowledge included island lists, including their size, reef and harbor locations, whether they were inhabited, and if so, the name of the chief and any food produced there. More importantly, his memory would include the bearing of each island, the time to get there, and the succession of stars and islands to follow to get there. These islands included the Society Islands, the Austral Islands, the Cook Islands, plus Samoa, Tonga, Tokelau and Fiji.

Bora Bora warriors invaded Ra'iatea around 1763, wounding Tupaia and forcing him to flee to Tahiti, where he sought protection from the Papara chief Amo and his wife Purea. Tupaia soon became their advisor and high priest, and eventually Purea's lover. Tupaia befriended Samuel Wallis during his observation of a solar eclipse, and then Joseph Banks during the 1769 Transit of Venus observed from Tahiti. After which, Tupaia "attached himself to the British," according to Anne Salmond. Tupaia was also an artist, and ten watercolors of his survive.

Joining Endeavour 

Tupaia joined Endeavour in July 1769 when it passed his home island of Ra'iatea in the outward voyage from Plymouth. He was welcomed aboard at the insistence of Sir Joseph Banks, the Cook expedition's official botanist, on the basis of his evident skill as a navigator and mapmaker: when asked for details of the region Tupaia drew a chart showing all 130 islands within a  radius and was able to name 74 of them. Banks welcomed the Raiatean's interest in travelling with Endeavour to England where he could be presented as an anthropological curiosity. Australian academic Vanessa Smith has speculated that Banks also envisaged conversation, amusement and possibly a genuine friendship from Tupaia's company during the voyage.  As Cook at first refused to allow Tupaia to join the expedition for financial reasons, Banks agreed to be responsible for the Raiatean's welfare and upkeep while on board.

Expedition and Tupaia's map

As Cook intended to spend several weeks in the Society Islands before heading south, Tupaia assisted the expedition as an interlocutor and interpreter with local tribes. He also worked closely with Banks in compiling an account of Tahiti and its inhabitants. On August 15, 1769, Tupaia began to work on a Chart of the Pacific Ocean in collaboration with Cook, Banks, and several of Cook's officers.

Older research summarized by Joan Druett assumed that Tupaia's own voyaging experience was limited. It holds that Tupaia had navigated from Ra'iatea in short voyages to 13 islands shown on the resulting map. He had not visited western Polynesia, as since his grandfather’s time the extent of voyaging by Raiateans had diminished to the islands of eastern Polynesia. His grandfather and father had passed to Tupaia the knowledge as to the location of the major islands of western Polynesia and the navigation information necessary to voyage to Fiji, Samoa and Tonga. It was also assumed that Cook was less pleased than Banks with Tupaia's evident navigational skills, resolving instead to rely on his own exploration of the region.

More recent research challenged the view that Tupaia's travels in the wider region were limited, and questioned Cook's failing appreciation of Tupaia as misinterpretations of the source material. In an extended reading of Tupaia's Map, Lars Eckstein and Anja Schwarz propose that Tupaia had detailed navigational knowledge which extended throughout the Polynesian triangle (with the probable exception of only Aotearoa New Zealand). The chart he drew for James Cook in August 1769 shows interconnected voyaging routes ranging from Rotuma west of Samoa, via Samoa and Tonga, the southern Cook Islands and the Austral Group, Mangareva and Pitcairn all the way to Rapa Nui. A second major composite route leads from Tahiti through the Tuamotu Group to the Marquesas Group and on to Oahu in Hawai'i. Tupaia invented a cartographic system for Cook and his men which located a northern bearing from any island he drew in the centre of his Chart (marked by the word 'avatea', this is '[the sun at] noon'). This allowed him to translate his own wayfinding knowledge for island-to-island voyages into the logic and terms of Cook's compass. The Admiralty manuscript of James Cook's journal indicates that Tupaia told Cook that he himself (or his ancestors) travelled to most islands drawn on the Chart excepting only Rotuma (north of Fiji) and Oahu in Hawai'i.

Tupaia accompanied Cook to New Zealand and was welcomed by some of the Māori as a tohunga (an expert). It seems that they presented him with a precious dog-skin cloak.
Many Maori people have tales including Tupaia and his lineage that remains in New Zealand today. The crew of Endeavour had developed a less favorable impression of their shipmate. One, midshipman Joseph Marra, recorded that:Toobia ... was a man of real genius, a priest of the first order, and an excellent artist: he was, however, by no means beloved by the Endeavours crew, being looked upon as proud and austere, extorting homage, which the sailors who thought themselves degraded by bending to an Indian , were very unwilling to pay, and preferring complaints against them on the most trivial occasions.

Tupaia landed at Botany Bay, Australia, in late April 1770. Cook said of Tupaia, "...by means of Tupaia...you would always get people to direct you from Island to Island and would be sure of meeting with a friendly resception and refreshments at every Island you came to."

Death 

Tupaia died on 20 December 1770.  This date is confirmed in the muster records of Endeavour. Other dates are suggested by the journals of Joseph Banks and James Cook. Joseph Banks’s journal has an entry for 11 November, in which he wrote “We receivd the news of Tupias death”.  However, Banks was ill for much of his time at Batavia, and wrote many entries later on, using incorrect dates. James Cook’s journal has an entry for 26 December, in which he wrote “we lost... Tupia”.  However, this entry is a summary of several events that occurred during the stay in Batavia.

Tupaia died from either dysentery or malaria, both of which were present aboard Endeavour during its berthing for repairs in Batavia. Cook recorded his passing in his journal: "He was a Shrewd, Sensible, Ingenious Man, but proud and obstinate which often made his situation on board both disagreeable to himself and those about him, and tended much to promote the deceases that put a period to his life."

Legacy
When Cook returned to New Zealand in 1773, the Maori approached his ship shouting "Tupaia! Tupaia!". As Cook noted, "...the Name of Tupia was at that time so popular among them that it would be no wonder if at this time it is known over the great part of New Zealand."

Notes

Further reading

 Druett, Joan (2011). Tupaia, Random House, New Zealand; 
 Eckstein, Lars and Anja Schwarz (2019), “The Making of Tupaia’s Map: A Story of the Extent and Mastery of Polynesian Navigation, Competing Systems of Wayfinding on James Cook’s Endeavour, and the Invention of an Ingenious Cartographic System”. The Journal of Pacific History 54(1): 1-95. https://www.tandfonline.com/doi/full/10.1080/00223344.2018.1512369; see also: https://www.uni-potsdam.de/en/iaa-alc/tupaias-map.html
 Lars Eckstein and Anja Schwarz (2019), "The Making of Tupaia's Map Revisited", The Journal of Pacific History 54(4). https://www.tandfonline.com/doi/full/10.1080/00223344.2019.1657500.
 
 King, Michael (2003). History of New Zealand, Penguin, 
 Tupaia at the New Zealand Electronic Text Centre

Polynesian navigators
Polynesian explorers of the Pacific
Raiatean explorers
James Cook
1725 births
1770 deaths
Infectious disease deaths in Indonesia
Deaths from dysentery
Tohunga
Deaths from malaria